"I Wanna Be Your Dog" is a song by American rock band the Stooges. Released as the group's debut single from the band's 1969 self-titled debut album. The riff is composed of only three chords (G, F♯ and E), is played continuously throughout the song (excepting two brief 4-bar bridges). The 3-minute-and-9-second-long song, with its distortion-heavy guitar intro, single-note piano riff played by producer John Cale of the Velvet Underground, and steady, driving beat, gave the cutting edge of the early heavy metal and punk sound.

In 2004, the song was ranked number 438 on Rolling Stone magazine's list of the "500 Greatest Songs of All Time", but it was dropped at number 445 on its 2010 revision, then was re-ranked at number 314 on its 2021 list. Pitchfork Media placed it at number 16 on its list of "The 200 Greatest Songs of the 1960s".

Personnel
Iggy Pop - vocals
Ron Asheton - guitar
Dave Alexander - bass
Scott Asheton - drums
John Cale - piano, sleigh bells

Appearances in media
The song is part of the soundtrack of numerous films, such as Lock, Stock and Two Smoking Barrels (1998), Friday Night Lights (2004), How I Met Your Mother (S2E16 "Stuff", 2007), Transporter 3 (2008), The Runaways (2010), Faster (2010), CBGB (2013), Cruella (2021), Reservation Dogs (2021), etc.
The song was part of the fictional radio station Liberty Rock Radio in Grand Theft Auto IV (2008). Iggy Pop hosts the station.

Cover versions
Sid Vicious performed a version of the song on his debut album Sid Sings. Actor Gary Oldman performed the song as Sid in the film Sid & Nancy.
Anti Pasti covered this song as their final track on their 1981 debut LP The Last Call.
Joan Jett and the Blackhearts covered this song in 1988 on their album Up Your Alley.
Swans side-project The World of Skin covered the song and included it as a bonus track on the CD version of their 1988 album Shame, Humility, Revenge.
Sonic Youth covered this song live on David Sanborn's Night Music TV show in 1989.
Uncle Tupelo recorded an acoustic version of this song during sessions for their album, Still Feel Gone. The cover was later released as a bonus track to March 16–20, 1992. They also recorded an electric version.
Mephisto Walz covered this song on the 1994 album "The Eternal Deep".
Slayer covered this song on the 1996 Undisputed Attitude with changed lyrics, renaming it "I’m Gonna Be Your God". 
Émilie Simon covered the song in 2003 on her eponymous debut album.
Matt Mays recorded a cover of the song on his 2020 album Dog City.
Actor John McCrea sang a cover version heard in the 2021 film Cruella. McCrea also appeared in the film. Damiano David, lead vocalist of Måneskin, performed a cover of the song for the Italian dub of the film.
Modern Life Is War released a cover in 2021 on their EP "Tribulation Worksongs, Vol. 3".

References

External links
 

1969 debut singles
1969 songs
The Stooges songs
Émilie Simon songs
Songs written by Iggy Pop
Song recordings produced by John Cale
Elektra Records singles